Heritage High School is a public secondary school located in Leesburg, Virginia, and is part of Loudoun County Public Schools.  The principal is Jeff Adam. Its naming broke the previous tradition of naming high schools with two words prior to "High School" (Loudoun County High School, Broad Run High School, etc.).

Though Heritage is located in the southern border of Leesburg, adjacent to J. Lupton Simpson Middle School and Evergreen Mill Elementary School, it does not serve the southern Leesburg community. Instead, Heritage serves the densely populated eastern section of Leesburg, including the Sycamore Hill, Potomac Station, Tavistock Farms, Kincaid Forest, Red Rock, Spring Lakes neighborhoods and River Creek communities.

History
Heritage opened in 2002 for the eastern Leesburg community, feeding most of its students from Stone Bridge High School and the rest from Loudoun County High School.  It was originally expected that Simpson's 8th graders would feed into Heritage, but instead, boundary lines were drawn to have Harper Park Middle School feed into Heritage.  The lines were drawn and are still drawn to the point where students who live in communities adjacent to Heritage do not go there for high school and instead go to Loudoun County High.

Like other new high schools that opened in Loudoun County before it, such as Stone Bridge and Potomac Falls, Heritage opened without a senior class, and juniors were allowed to choose which school they wanted to graduate from.  Most Heritage students came from the Stone Bridge attendance area, and many rising juniors (Class of 2004) at Stone Bridge chose to stay there rather than go to Heritage.  This was somewhat understandable because Leesburg students at Stone Bridge in the class of 2004 attended J.L. Simpson Middle School for 6th and 7th grade (1997–1999); went to a brand new Harper Park Middle School for 8th grade (1999–2000); went to a brand new Stone Bridge for their first two years of high school (2000–2002); and then were expected to go to another new school for their last two years.  Constant boundary adjustments may have contributed to the large number of rising juniors who wished to remain at Stone Bridge. Consequently, the junior class at Heritage was only about 110 members, rather than about 250 if all juniors were required to go to the new school. In 2010, Heritage switch some of its students to Tuscarora High School in order to alleviate overcrowding.

Of the 312 students in the graduating class of 2006, 112 received the governor's seal on an Advanced Studies diploma, one of the highest academic honors offered by the Commonwealth of Virginia.  Like other Loudoun County high schools, Heritage participates in the Advanced Placement program and offers numerous AP courses.

Mimi Groves & Jimmy Galligan
In June of 2020, following the George Floyd protests and Mimi Groves posting support for the Black Lives Matter movement, a short video made by her in 2016 began circulating online. The video drew criticism as she, a white freshman student, used a racial slur while stating excitedly, "I can drive, [slur]" after getting her learner's permit. The slur was not directed at anyone specifically. The video was posted online by another classmate, Jimmy Galligan, who "wanted to get her where she would understand the severity of that word." This came shortly after Groves was accepted to the cheerleading team of the University of Tennessee, Knoxville. Following this controversy and a public outcry, the university removed Groves from the cheerleading team and she came under pressure to withdraw from the school altogether.

In late 2020, this became a national news story and Heritage and Loudoun County Public Schools came under fire for being a "hostile learning environment" for students in minorities. Galligan also came under scrutiny for perpetuating cancel culture, with many seeing this as unfair treatment towards Groves.

Accreditation and test scores

Accreditation
Heritage High School is a fully accredited high school based on the Standards of Learning tests in Virginia.

SAT scores
The average SAT score in 2006 for Heritage was a 1,532 (518 in math; 515 in critical reading; 499 in writing).

Enrollment history

Athletics
The mascot is the Pride, in the shape of a Lion.  Heritage's sports teams currently play in the Dulles District and Region II of the Virginia High School League.  The Pride opened as a member of this district.

Basketball

The school is well known for its boys' basketball team which consistently has made it to Region II playoffs, Its 2006 team was the first undefeated team in the history of the Dulles District. The Pride boys' basketball team has won 3 consecutive Dulles District Championships: 2006, 2007, and 2008.

Soccer

The boys' soccer team did well in the 2006 season, shaking off the new school reputation, with the Pride's soccer team making it to the AA State Semifinals before falling 2–1 to AA Dulles District champion Potomac Falls.  A tenacious rivalry would develop between the two teams, who met five times that season with the Panthers going 4–0–1, including wins over the Pride in the Dulles District Tournament Finals, the Region II Finals, and the State Semifinals.

They finished Second place in the 2007 Regular Season after topping Potomac Falls for a period, who had suffered a tie to Loudoun County and a tie 2–2 to the Pride.  However, Potomac Falls would end any chance of Pride Silverware by beating them 0–3 in a heated game away near the end of the season.  In the Dulles District Tournament, the Pride finished in Second after a heart breaking overtime loss to Loudoun County finishing 2–1; ending the campaign early.

Two years later in 2010, Coach Betsey Munson and a new squad would go on to make another run, finishing in Second place for the Regular Season and making it to the Post-Season Tournament Final, but this time in the AAA Cedar Run District.  In the Tournament Final, they narrowly missed out losing to Battlefield 1–2; Jake Flanagan scored the Pride’s lone goal unassisted. Having finished Second in both competitions the Pride would advance and make an away Regional Appearance.

In 2013, Coach Munson claimed the state record for having the most wins as a female coach in Virginia High School League history for boys soccer.

The Pride defeated Park View 3–0 and became Regular District Champions for the second time from a hat-trick by Gio Vasquez against Park View in 2015

Lacrosse

The Heritage boys' lacrosse team did well in the 2007 and 2008 seasons, finishing 15–3 and 14–3 respectively.  They were tournament champions in 2007 and regular season champions in 2008.  The class of 2008 has had the strongest class in school history and graduated with the most wins in school history.  The class of 2008 also had 3 members go on to play collegiately at the NCAA level.

Other Sports

Heritage teams did surprisingly well in the 2005–2006 year.  Both the girls' and boys' track teams won their respective AA Dulles District Titles.  The football team also had its first winning season in the 2005–2006 school year, with a 7–3 record, sharing the Dulles District title with Park View High School, but unable to make the playoffs because Park View had more power points in the Virginia High School League’s rating system. in 2015, third year head coach Reed Prosser helped the Pride to a 6–4 record, after starting 6–0, and to a playoff appearance.

The Heritage girls' varsity swim and dive team have made a vast improvement over the season of 2014–2015. Seeing as the girls have placed first in the Conference 21 meet, taking first at regionals was an even bigger step. To finish up the season, the team placed third in the 4A Northern Virginia Annual States meet.  There were also many record-breakers for swimmers on the Heritage varsity swim and dive team in the 2014–2015 season.

Arts

Marching Band 
The Pride of Heritage Marching Band competes in the 2A division of USBands. They placed 2nd in the state and 8th at nationals in 2017. The band is currently under the direction of George Herrmann. In 2018 the band placed second in the state again, while winning the overall music caption award. In 2019, the band placed 6th in the state along with also receiving the overall music award.

References

Public high schools in Virginia
Educational institutions established in 2002
Northern Virginia Scholastic Hockey League teams
Schools in Loudoun County, Virginia
2002 establishments in Virginia
Leesburg, Virginia